The 1977 Michigan State Spartans football team represented Michigan State University in the 1977 Big Ten Conference football season. Led by second-year head coach Darryl Rogers, the Spartans compiled an overall record of 7–3–1 with a mark of 6–1–1 in conference play, placing third in the Big Ten.

Schedule

Roster

Game summaries

Michigan

    
    
    
    
    
    

On October 8, 1977, Michigan State lost to Michigan, 24–14, at Spartan Stadium. Michigan State took a 7-0 lead on a 19-yard touchdown pass from Ed Smith to Kirk Gibson. Michigan responded with a 12-yard touchdown pass from Rick Leach to White and a 50-yard field goal to take a 10–7 lead at halftime. Michigan extended its lead to 24–7 in the third quarter on touchdown runs by Russell Davis and Ed Leach. Harlan Huckleby rushed for 146 yards, and Russell Davis added 96 yards. Ralph Clayton caught three passes for 99 yards. Michigan completed four of 10 passes in the game and threw only one pass in the second half.

References

Michigan State
Michigan State Spartans football seasons
Michigan State Spartans football